Gallery Row is a neighborhood in Downtown Los Angeles designated by the City Council in 2003 to promote the concentration of art galleries along Main Street and Spring Street.

Geography
Gallery Row spans north–south along Main and Spring Streets from 2nd Street in the north to 9th Street in the south.

History
Gallery Row was started based on a proposal by artists Nic Cha Kim and Kjell Hagen as members of the Arts, Aesthetics, and Culture (ACC) Committee of the Downtown Los Angeles Neighborhood Council (DLANC).

At that time, there were only three galleries in the area: Inshallah Gallery on Main Street near 3rd, bank (Lorraine Molina) on Main Street near 4th, 727 Gallery on Spring Street near 7th (Adrian Rivas, James Rojas). The borders of the proposed district was largely driven by the desire for inclusion of the existing art venues, as well as the obvious potential for expansion and infill in the largely vacant district.

In 2003, much of the Historic Core shared attributes with Skid Row. By day, the area was marginally active with shoppers and other visitors, but by evening, most establishments closed and people left for elsewhere.

The City Council motion (co-sponsored by Jan Perry and Antonio Villaraigosa) to designate Gallery Row was passed in July 2003, and “Gallery Row” street signs were installed in the fall. Chaired by Nic Cha Kim and Santonia Amberly, the AAC Committee met weekly at Inshallah Gallery to plan an official opening ceremony, which was scheduled for May 15, 2004.

Inaugurated at Biddy Mason Park on Spring Street, the event consisted of a ceremony hosted by Los Angeles City officials, temporary galleries set up in empty storefronts by Phantom Galleries and THE MAX, a series of theatre readings at LATC, and information booths supporting the local community.

By September 2004, there were 8 galleries operating.

Downtown Art Walk
The Downtown Art Walk is a monthly, self-guided tour of the art exhibition venues in Downtown Los Angeles, which includes the commercial art galleries, public museums, and non-profit arts venues. The Downtown Art Walk occurs every 2nd Thursday of the month.

The Downtown Art Walk was begun by gallery-owner Bert Green, a month in advance of the opening of his gallery at 5th and Main. The AAC committee was spun off as the nonprofit Gallery Row Organization, which serves to promote and develop the cultural resources of the district.

In 2007 the number of participating galleries reached 30, and in 2010, about 40. In 2007, DLANC sponsored the Art Walk shuttle, which began service in June 2007. Although, until recently, the area was sparsely populated after dark, the numbers of visitors grew substantially from only about 75 in September 2004 to more than 15,000 in 2010.

Between 2003 and 2010 the area has also seen an explosion in residential conversion of formerly vacant or underused commercial buildings. As the resident population increased, so has the cultural vitality of the district. The Downtown Art Walk now attracts thousands of people, and the Historic Core and Gallery Row are becoming recognized as one of the most significant success stories in Los Angeles history.

See also

Gentrification
Urban renaissance
Urban renewal

References

External links
 Gallery Row site
 Downtown Art Walk site
 Downtown Los Angeles Neighborhood Council site

Populated places established in 2003
Districts of Downtown Los Angeles